Kagura Dam is a gravity dam located in Akita Prefecture in Japan. The dam is used for flood control. The catchment area of the dam is 25.1 km2. The dam impounds about 14  ha of land when full and can store 857 thousand cubic meters of water. The construction of the dam was completed in 1957.

References

Dams in Akita Prefecture
1957 establishments in Japan